El Carmen de Atrato is a municipality and town in the Chocó Department, Colombia.

Climate
El Carmen de Atrato has an subtropical highland climate (Köppen Cfb) which borders a tropical rainforest climate. The town’s high altitude makes its climate more like that of the Andean Region than the climate of most of Chocó Department, although it still receives more than twice as much rain as Bogotá.

References

External links
  El Carmen de Atrato official website

Municipalities of Chocó Department